The 2006–07 Macedonian Second Football League was the fifteenth season since its establishment. It began on 5 August 2006 and ended on 26 May 2007.

Participating teams

League table

Results
Every team will play three times against each other team for a total of 33 matches. The first 22 matchdays will consist of a regular double round-robin schedule. The league standings at this point will then be used to determine the games for the last 11 matchdays.

Matches 1–22

Matches 23–33

Promotion playoff

Relegation playoff

Note: After the play-off chaos, the Football Federation of Macedonia was decided that no teams were relegated from the Second League and the all 5 winners from the Third League were promoted. In addition, the FFM was decided will be played an additional play-off match between the two second placed team from the Northern group of the Third League, Lokomotiva and the second placed from the Southwestern group Korabi and the winner Lokomotiva was promoted to the Second League.

See also
2006–07 Macedonian Football Cup
2006–07 Macedonian First Football League

References

External links
Football Federation of Macedonia 
MacedonianFootball.com 

Macedonia 2
2
Macedonian Second Football League seasons